The Huallanca mountain range (possibly from Quechua, wallanka mountain range; a cactus plant (Opuntia subulata); also called Chaupi Janca or Shicra Shicra (possibly from Quechua sikra woven basket) lies in the Andes of Peru. It is located in the Ancash Region, Bolognesi Province. The Huallanca mountain range is a small range southeast of the Cordillera Blanca and north of the Huayhuash mountain range extending between 9°52' and 10°03'S and 76°58' and 77°04'W for about 19 km in a northeasterly direction.

East of the town of Aquia there is a small range called Huaman Hueque (possibly from Quechua waman falcon or variable hawk, wiqi tear). It is sometimes considered a sub-range of the Huallanca range. The Huaman Hueque range is dominated by Kikash.

Mountains 
The main peaks are listed below: 

 Chaupijanca, 
 Chuspi, 
 Kikash, 
 Kuntur Wayi, 
 Minapata, 
 Qawi, 
 Tankan, 
 Tancancocha, 
 Tawqan,

Lakes 

There are numerous mostly small lakes along the range. Some of them on the western side are Tankanqucha, Yanaqucha, Kallapuyuq and Quntayqucha (from north to south). East the range there are Quntayqucha, Suyruqucha, Tankanqucha, Awasqucha, Tawqanqucha, Asulqucha, Pampaqucha and Susuqucha.

References

External links 

Mountain ranges of Peru
Mountain ranges of Ancash Region